Miller Lake is a body of freshwater located in the western part of the Gouin Reservoir, in the territory of the town of La Tuque, in the administrative region of the Mauricie, in the province of Quebec, in Canada.

This lake extends entirely in the canton of Lacasse.

Recreotourism activities are the main economic activity of the sector. Forestry comes second. Recreational boating is particularly popular on this water, especially for sport fishing.

The Miller Lake watershed is served on the north side by some secondary forest roads that have been developed for logging. These forest roads connect north to the R1045 forest road serving the north shore of the Gouin Reservoir.

The surface of Miller Lake is usually frozen from mid-November to the end of April, however, safe ice circulation is generally from early December to late March. Water management at the Gouin Dam can lead to significant variations in the water level, particularly at the end of the winter when the water is lowered. The water level of this bay equilibrates with that of the Gouin Reservoir.

Geography

Toponymy
The term "Miller" is a family name of English origin.

The French toponym "lac Miller" was formalized on 5 décembre 1968 by the Commission de toponymie du Québec, e.g. at its creation.

Notes and references

See also 

Lakes of Mauricie
La Tuque, Quebec